Kris Kringle may refer to:

 Santa Claus, by assimilation in the United States of the separate German tradition below
 Kris Kringle, the lead character in Miracle on 34th Street
Kris Kringle, the lead character in Santa Claus Is Comin' to Town (film)
 Kris Kringle, the father of the lead character in the 2019 movie Noelle.
 Kris Kringle, the lead character in the movie Fatman.
 Christkind (also called Christkindl), the Austrian and German Christmas gift-bringer, the Christ Child
 Secret Santa, a gift exchange deriving from the Christkindl tradition

See also
 Father Christmas (disambiguation)